Foldnes Church is a parish church of the Church of Norway in Øygarden Municipality in Vestland county, Norway. It is located in the village of Foldnes on the island of Litlesotra. It is one of the three churches for the Fjell parish which is part of the Vesthordland prosti (deanery) in the Diocese of Bjørgvin. The modern-looking wood and leca church was built in a rectangular design in 2001 using plans drawn up by the architect Kolbjørn Jensen. The church seats about 700 people.

History
The new church at Foldnes was established in 2001. Planning for the church began in the 1990s. The architect, Kolbjørn Jensen, from the firm Signatur arkitekter was hired to design the building. The church was consecrated on 22 April 2001. The church has been awarded a couple of architectural prizes: Fjell municipality's building prize in 2002 and the Bergen area masonry prize in 2003.

See also
List of churches in Bjørgvin

References

Øygarden
Churches in Vestland
Rectangular churches in Norway
Concrete churches in Norway
21st-century Church of Norway church buildings
Churches completed in 2001
2001 establishments in Norway